Uvariopsis bisexualis is a species of plant in the Annonaceae family. It is endemic to Tanzania.

References

Annonaceae
Endemic flora of Tanzania
Vulnerable plants
Taxonomy articles created by Polbot